Kim Bingham, also known by her stage names Mudgirl and The Kim Band, is a Canadian singer and musician. She is also known for collaborations with Nelly Furtado, Bran Van 3000 and David Usher.

Career

1990–1994: Me Mom and Morgentaler 

Bingham began her career in music as a member of the Montreal, Quebec, third-wave ska band Me Mom and Morgentaler formed in 1990. The band became known for elaborate live performances, spectacles of vaudevillian-styled performance art. With the band, Bingham recorded three works: Clown Heaven and Hell EP (1991), Shiva Space Machine (1993) and Live We Are Revolting: Live & Obscure 1990–1994 (1994).

1994–1999: Mudgirl 
In 1994, Bingham left Me, Mom and Morgentaler and moved to Vancouver where she formed the project Mudgirl with drummer/vocalist Glenn Kruger (Carly Rae Jepsen, the Paperboys, Bloody Chicletts), bassist/vocalist Russell Less (Innocents Abroad, the Ground), & guitarist Lucas Truman. Her moniker "Mudgirl" was chosen based on "the title of a short story she wrote about a waif made of mud" intended for children. She stated, "Mudgirl is an extension of myself where I get to be cartoony and a bit surreal." In 1996, Mudgirl released their debut five-song EP "First Book" which included three Canadian radio hits "This Day", "Adjusted" and "Contact" (written by Russell Less). She also produced a handful of popular videos featured on MuchMusic, and performed on some dates in the U.S., including a July 1996 performance with Mudgirl at Lilith Fair.

1999–2006: The Kim Band 

After five years as Mudgirl, Bingham decided to change the name of her collective to "The Kim Band". Under this moniker, she released the album "Girlology" (2001) produced by Steven Drake (The Odds, The Tragically Hip). The album featured the radio singles "What A Drag", "Valentine's Day"  and "Quel Dommage", her French version of "What A Drag" that reached No.1 on French-Canadian radio charts.

Collaborations with David Usher, Nelly Furtado and Bran Van 3000. 2000–2003: Touring, bands 
From 2001 until 2003, Bingham worked with Canadian singer David Usher as a guitarist and backing vocalist. "Black Black Heart" is a song written by Usher and Jeff Pearce and for which the operatic female vocal is provided by Bingham, while the chorus samples The Flower Duet (Sous le dôme épais), a duet for sopranos from Léo Delibes' opera Lakmé, as a hook. "Black Black Heart" won two MuchMusic Video Awards for Best Post-Production and Best Pop Video in 2002.

In 2003 and early 2004, Bingham toured Europe and the U.S. with pop singer Nelly Furtado as a guitarist and backing vocalist in Furtado's band. Bingham collaborated, also, with Bran Van 3000 and is featured on the albums "Rosé" and "The Garden". Bingham also toured in Canada as part of Bran Van 3000, including a concert as the main act at the Montreal Jazz Festival in 2008.

Les Invincibles 2005–2009 

From 2005 to 2009, Bingham composed the soundtrack for the TV trilogy Les Invincibles with three seasons on the original Canadian TV production (broadcast on Radio Canada) and two seasons on the reprised European versions, a Franco-Belgian-German production (broadcast on Arte). In 2007, Bingham's original music for the Canadian series was nominated as Best Original Score at the Prix Gémeaux television award; Bingham won the Best Theme Song award with the theme song "The Heroes Take", shared with co-writer and show creator Jean-Francois Rivard. Also in 2007, at the request of fans of the Canadian TV show, Bingham performed and produced the soundtrack album "Les Invincibles" with the support of Warner Music Canada.

UP! and single releases 2010–2020 

Bingham's next work, the full-length album "UP!", was recorded in Los Angeles with co-producer John Kastner (Doughboys, All Systems Go) and with members of super bands such as Queens Of the Stone Age, Jellyfish, Blind Melon and Masters of Reality over the summer of 2010. The album was released in  May 2012 under Bingham's longstanding indie label Mudgirl Music Group, with distribution by Distribution Select across Canada.

The stop-motion animation video for the album single "Up!" won the Best Video award at the 2013 edition of the Independent Music Awards USA. The French version of the song "UP!" and the sole French single on the album, a song called "Party Girl", were once again radio hits for Bingham in French-speaking parts of Canada. In January 2019, the song "Bel Ami" from Bingham's album "UP!" was chosen as the theme song for the US TV series "Good Trouble". In summer 2019, Bingham released her first single performed in both English and Italian, the upbeat pop song "Beppe Green".

Style 
According to The Spokesman-Review, Bingham "plays a musical style modeled after the eclectic pop of The The."

Personal life 
Bingham was raised in Montreal, Canada and presently lives in France.

Awards

Discography

With Me Mom and Morgentaler 
Albums
1991: Clown Heaven and Hell EP
1993: Shiva Space Machine
1994: We Are Revolting: Live & Obscure 1990–1994 (live)

Solo material

Albums

Singles

TV scores 
2005–09: Les Invincibles (Canada) – composer
2008–10: Les Invincibles (France-Germany) – composer
2019: Song "Bel Ami" used as theme music for Good Trouble (US) – composer

Guest appearances

See also 
List of musicians from British Columbia
List of Canadian musicians

References

External links 

 KimBingham.com

Canadian singer-songwriters
Singers from Montreal
French-language singers of Canada
Living people
Canadian alternative rock musicians
Canadian women rock singers
Canadian women pop singers
21st-century Canadian women singers
1969 births